The 1998 International Sports Racing Series was the second season of International Sportscar Racing Series (later known as the FIA Sportscar Championship).  It was a series for sportscar-style prototypes broken into two classes based on power and weight, called SR1 and SR2, as well as a class of hillclimb-style sportscars, called CN.  It began on April 13, 1998, and ended December 6, 1998, after 8 races.

Schedule

Season results

Teams Championship
Points are awarded to the top 10 finishers in the order of 20-15-12-10-8-6-4-3-2-1.  Only the highest placing car within a team earned points towards the championship.  The SportsRacing World Cup was available to all teams that participated, but separate SR2 and CN championships were also held.

Overall standings

SR2 standings

CN standings

External links
 1998 International Sports Racing Series results

International Sports Racing Series
FIA Sportscar Championship